Carmignani is an Italian surname. Notable people with the surname include:

Giulio Carmignani (1813–1890), Italian landscape painter
Pietro Carmignani (born 1945), Italian footballer and coach

Italian-language surnames